The 1911 World Greco-Roman Wrestling Championship were held in Helsinki, Grand Duchy of Finland, Russian Empire.

Medal table

Medal summary

Men's Greco-Roman

References
UWW Database

World Wrestling Championships
W
W
International sports competitions in Helsinki
International wrestling competitions hosted by Finland
March 1911 sports events
1910s in Helsinki